Kelsie Rainbow (born 26 September 1996) is an Australian netball player who has played in the Victorian Netball League and the Australian Netball League. In 2018 she was a member of the Tasmanian Magpies team that won the ANL title. In 2018 and 2019 Rainbow served as a training partner for Collingwood Magpies.

Early life and education
Rainbow is originally from Winnaleah, Tasmania. Between 2011 and 2014 she attended Scotch Oakburn College and between 2015 and 2017 she attended Monash University where she studied nutritional science. In 2012 she represented Tasmania as an under-18 cross country runner.

Playing career

Cavaliers
Rainbow played for Cavaliers, a Launceston-based team in the Tasmanian Netball League. In both 2011 and 2012 she was named in the TNL Under-19 All Star Teams and in 2013 she was named in the TNL Open All Star Team.

Victorian Netball League
Between 2015 and 2017, while attending Monash University, Rainbow also played for Monash University Storm in the Victorian Netball League. Since 2018 she has played in the VNL for Melbourne University Lightning.

Australian Netball League
Victorian Fury
In 2016 Rainbow was called up as a replacement player for Victorian Fury. She was subsequently included in the 2017 Fury squad. While a member of the Fury squad she also served as a training partner with  Melbourne Vixens.

Tasmanian Magpies
In 2018 Rainbow began playing for Tasmanian Magpies. Together with Melissa Bragg, Gabrielle Sinclair and Cody Lange, Rainbow was a member of the Magpies team that won the 2018 Australian Netball League title. She was subsequently included in the 2019 and 2020 Tasmanian Magpies squads.

Collingwood Magpies
In 2018 and 2019 Rainbow served as a training partner for Collingwood Magpies.
On 29 March 2018 she made her senior debut for Collingwood Magpies during the Tasmanian Netball Invitational Series at the Silverdome in Launceston.

National team
Rainbow was included in an advance Australia squad for the 2017 Netball World Youth Cup.

Honours
Tasmanian Magpies
Australian Netball League
Winners: 2018: 1

References

Living people
1996 births
Australian netball players
Australian female cross country runners
Victorian Fury players
Collingwood Magpies Netball players
Tasmanian Magpies players
Victorian Netball League players
Australian Netball League players
Netball players from Tasmania
Monash University alumni